Alexander Lewis Newby (born 21 November 1995) is an English professional footballer who plays for Colchester United, as a midfielder.

Career
Born in Barrow-in-Furness, Newby began his career with Bolton Wanderers, and played non-league football for Barrow, Kendal Town and Clitheroe, before signing for Chorley in February 2018.

He moved to Rochdale in August 2020, signing a two-year contract. On 8 September 2020 he scored his first goal for Rochdale in an EFL Trophy tie against Morecambe. In June 2022 it was announced that he would sign for Colchester United on 1 July 2022, on a free  transfer.

Personal life
His twin brother Elliot is also footballer.

References

1995 births
Living people
English footballers
Bolton Wanderers F.C. players
Barrow A.F.C. players
Kendal Town F.C. players
Clitheroe F.C. players
Chorley F.C. players
Rochdale A.F.C. players
Colchester United F.C. players
Association football midfielders
English Football League players
National League (English football) players